Abhidhajamahāraṭṭhaguru is an honorific Burmese Buddhist title conferred by the government of Myanmar, to the Buddhist monks who have contributed to the pariyatti field. The awardees are annually announced on the 4th January, the Independence Day of Myanmar.

Qualifications
According to the section 6 (A) of the Provisions on the Religious Titles promulgated on 17 June 2015, a recipient must meet the following qualifications:
 Possesses the Aggamahāpaṇḍita title
 Has at least 60 years (vassas) in the monkhood
 Has a good general knowledge
 Has written beneficial works to the Buddha's Sāsana
 Serves as a chief abbot of a monastic college
 Commands authority and has influence among Sangha disciples
 Has been respected by the public for his morals, attitude and wisdom

Recipients

2022

2021

2020

2019

Note

References

Burmese Buddhist titles